Nekrylovo is a rural locality (a settlement) in Krasnyanskoye Rural Settlement, Novokhopyorsky District, Voronezh Oblast, Russia. The population was 783 as of 2010. There are 11 streets.

Geography 
Nekrylovo is located 17 km northwest of Novokhopyorsk (the district's administrative centre) by road. Krasnoye is the nearest rural locality.

References 

Populated places in Novokhopyorsky District